The Geryoniidae are a family of hydrozoans in the order Trachymedusae.

List of genera
Geryonia Péron & Lesueur, 1810
Liriope Lesson, 1843
Nomen dubium
Heptarradiata Zamponi & Gezano, 1989
Octorradiata Zamponi & Gezano, 1989
Pentarradiata Zamponi & Gezano, 1989

References

 
Cnidarian families
Taxa named by Johann Friedrich von Eschscholtz